Maeva Méline (born 20 January 1980, Paris, France) is a French singer and actress.

Influenced by pop and folk, she took lessons in piano, self-taught guitar playing and singing which transformed her natural talent into beautiful music. She graduated law school. She starting performing in a jazz and funk band at small venues in Paris, drawing the attention of Warner Music Group, which offered her a record deal on their label. In 2008, Maeva was cast for the role of Nannerl in the highly acclaimed French musical Mozart, l'opéra rock, which brought her worldwide fame and recognition.

Career 

In 2008, Maeva Méline was selected for the role of Nannerl, sister of Mozart in the NRJ Award winning musical Mozart, l'opéra rock.

In 2010, she provided the vocals for the song "How to Believe" in the French version of Tinker Bell and the Great Fairy Rescue (Clochette et l'Expédition féerique). Also, Maeva was the voice actress and singer for Rapunzel in the French version of the Disney animated movie Tangled (Raiponce).

In 2011, Maeva released her singles : À Genoux and La Lumière. She returned to her role as a voice actress of Rapunzel for the French version of the Tangled sequel Tangled Ever After (Le Mariage de Raiponce). Maeva also performed the vocals of princess Merida for the French version of the Disney/Pixar animated film Brave (Rebelle).

In 2013, she participated in the second season of The Voice, la plus belle voix with the song "Skinny Love" by Bon Iver.

Discography

Singles

Filmography 
 2009 : Clochette et l'Expédition féerique (Tinker Bell and the Great Fairy Rescue) : Soloist for the song Comment y croire
 2010 : Raiponce (Tangled) : as princess Rapunzel (adult voice and soundtrack)
 2011 : Voice role for the French version of TV animated series Trust Me I'm a Genie (Diego et Ziggy)
 2011 : La Colline aux coquelicots (From Up on Poppy Hill) : Yûko
 2012 : Le Mariage de Raiponce (Tangled Ever After) : princess Rapunzel
 2012 : Rebelle (Brave) : princess Merida (singing voice, soundtrack)

References

External links 
  of Maeva Méline
 

1980 births
Living people
French women singers
French film actresses
French stage actresses
Musicians from Paris
French folk musicians
French voice actresses
French musical theatre actresses